is a Japanese light novel series written by Yuyuko Takemiya, with illustrations by Ēji Komatsu. The series includes 11 volumes (eight main series novels, plus three extras) published by ASCII Media Works between September 10, 2010 and March 10, 2014, and incorporates romantic comedy and supernatural themes. A manga adaptation by Umechazuke began serialization in the October 2011 issue of Dengeki Daioh. A 24-episode anime adaptation by J.C.Staff aired on MBS between October 2013 and March 2014.

Plot
Banri Tada is a newly admitted male student at a private law school in Tokyo. Due to the after-effects of a fall from a bridge shortly after his high school graduation, he has lost all of his memories prior to the accident (retrograde amnesia).

Banri finds himself completely and utterly lost after the big opening ceremonial event and tries to find his way to the freshman orientation. Along the way, he runs straight into another lost and confused freshman from the same school, Mitsuo Yanagisawa, and they immediately hit it off. Somehow arriving at their intended goal just in time, there appears in front of them a beautiful girl holding a bouquet of roses, who congratulates Mitsuo on getting into the school then hits him across the face with them before tossing the bouquet into his lap and leaving. This stylish, well dressed, and obsessive woman is revealed to be Mitsuo's childhood friend, Koko Kaga. As children, they had promised to marry each other one day, something she has taken to heart this entire time. Mitsuo had gone out secretly and taken the examination for this private college in order to escape from her, but she used her connections to find out about it and enrolled in the college herself.

Banri meets a second-year student named Linda; unbeknownst to him, she was his best friend in high school, and holds herself responsible for his memory loss. As the series progresses, Banri deals with his slowly re-emerging memories, which often come into conflict with a relationship that blooms between him and Kaga.

Characters
 
 
 Banri is a freshman studying law in a private university in Tokyo. His hometown is in Shizuoka Prefecture, and he now lives alone in a small apartment. The day after his third-year high school graduation ceremony, he fell from a bridge, and now suffers from severe retrograde amnesia, unable to remember anything from before the accident. He missed the college entrance exam and one year of school because of his hospitalization. He later meets Kōko Kaga, and falls in love with her.
 
 Declaring himself to have died at 18 years of age, he is a being seeming to be Banri's spirit. He possesses his memories from before the accident. Without anybody noticing, he has followed after Banri and has been watching over things especially how Banri always focuses on Kōko when the spirit is still in love with Linda.
 
 
 Kōko is a freshman law student at Banri's university. She is extremely popular among boys, but has few friends, due to people being intimidated and scared to talk to her because of her beauty. To all appearances, she is the perfect lady. Since elementary school, she has been obsessed with Mitsuo, her childhood friend, to the point of stalking him and exhibiting symptoms of borderline personality disorder. In that time, she made a promise to marry Mitsuo, and ever since had been making her plans so that everything would come out perfect. After Mitsuo finally makes her understand that her feelings are not reciprocated, she starts spending more time with Banri where she falls in love with him and they eventually start dating.
 
 
 Mitsuo is a freshman studying law in the same university as Banri. After the entrance ceremony, heading for freshman orientation, he gets lost on the campus, and meets and befriends Banri. Banri calls him . He has been the target of Kōko's obsessive, one-sided affection since their elementary school years. He secretly took the exam to this university in an attempt to escape from her. He lives alone in an apartment three train stops away from Banri's. Mitsuo has a crush on Chinami Oka that he even confessed to her at a party, only to be rejected, since she thought it was an alcohol-fueled joke. He later becomes romantically interested in Linda.
  
 
 Linda is a second-year student and member of the Japanese Festival Culture Research Society. Leaving out the details, she invites Banri and Kōko to join. She and Banri were best friends in high school, and Banri was in love with her. Although he has no memory of her, she was the reason he was on the bridge he fell from, waiting for her to either reject or accept his love with "yes" or "no". It is later revealed that she still has feelings for Banri when she met him outside the hospital he escaped from while her being represented to have enormous guilt towards Banri's accident before losing his memories. She even tells him it was already too late for her to reach him and save him by holding his hands tight. When Banri asks her what message she wants him to deliver, Linda talks about supporting him to do his best yet she adds she must not talk that way and therefore changing what she wants to tell him afterwards. However, Banri currently doesn't remember her final words.
  
 
 Nijigen is a freshman and Banri's friend. He gains his nickname at the tea ceremony club's welcoming party after declaring his despair of the three-dimensional world and that he would live for the two-dimensional world from then on. His nickname in high school was "Taka Satō". He plays a prominent role in the final stages of the story, where he helps Banri and Kōko get back together as he doesn't want to lose his best friend.
 
 
 Chinami is a short female student and a member of the Film Research Society. Chinami is the object of Mitsuo's desire who confessed to her at a party, but she turned him down by later saying it "doesn't count as a real confession." She is despised by Kōko a lot, although she knows Kōko actually doesn't want to admit Chinami is now a friend because of her pride. She is later shown to be always approached by Kōko as if the two girls are best friends already. She later cuts her hair to make it more like Linda's short hairstyle and cause she wants Mitsuo to see her like he sees Linda, but immediately regrets it after realizing how much it changed her appearance and that she failed to get Mitsuo to notice her. She also falls in love with Mitsuo after realizing he has feelings for Linda, but never confesses to him due to her foolishness and it goes unrequited, even by the end of the series.
 
 
 Kosshii is a third-year college senior and is the president of the Japanese Festival Culture Research Society.
Nana
 
 Nana is a third-year female student and also Banri's neighbor. She plays in a band and acts similarly to the character of the same name in the manga Nana.

Media

Light novels
Golden Time began as a light novel series written by Yuyuko Takemiya, with illustrations by Ēji Komatsu. ASCII Media Works published 11 novels between September 10, 2010 and March 8, 2014 under their Dengeki Bunko imprint; eight comprise the main story, while the other three are side story collections. Portions of the series have also been serialized in Dengeki Bunko Magazine.

Manga
A manga adaptation illustrated by Umechazuke was serialized in ASCII Media Works' Dengeki Daioh magazine from the October 2011 to the July 2016 issues. ASCII Media Works published nine tankōbon volumes from March 27, 2012 to September 27, 2016. Seven Seas Entertainment published the series in North America from October 2015 to January 2018.

Anime

A 24-episode anime television series adaptation, produced by Genco and J.C.Staff, aired between October 3, 2013 and March 27, 2014 on MBS. The series is directed by Chiaki Kon with scripts by Fumihiko Shimo and character design by Shinya Hasegawa. The series' music is composed by Yukari Hashimoto. For the first 12 episodes, the opening theme is "Golden Time" and the ending theme is "Sweet & Sweet Cherry". The series is being released on eight BD/DVD compilation volumes between December 25, 2013 and July 23, 2014. The anime has been licensed by Sentai Filmworks for streaming and home video release in 2014. Sentai re-released the series with an English dub on December 17, 2019.

Visual novel
A visual novel developed by Kadokawa Games, titled Golden Time: Vivid Memories, was released for the PlayStation Vita on March 27, 2014. The game received a Famitsu review score of 32/40.

Reception
The Mainichi Shimbun reported in March 2013 that over 710,000 copies of the light novel series have been sold in Japan.

References

External links
 Anime official website 
 Visual novel official website 
 

2010 Japanese novels
2011 manga
2013 anime television series debuts
2014 video games
Anime and manga based on light novels
ASCII Media Works manga
Book series introduced in 2010
Dengeki Bunko
Dengeki Daioh
Fiction about amnesia
J.C.Staff
Japan-exclusive video games
Kadokawa Dwango franchises
Light novels
PlayStation Vita games
PlayStation Vita-only games
Romantic comedy anime and manga
Sentai Filmworks
Seven Seas Entertainment titles
Shōnen manga
Supernatural anime and manga
Television shows based on light novels
Video games developed in Japan
Visual novels